Wielie Walie (Pronounced Vee-lee Vaa-lee) was an Afrikaans children's variety programme created by Louise Smit featuring puppets, which was broadcast from the launch of television in South Africa in 1976. With Karel and Sarel, two best friends but always fighting. Bennie always ready to read a story, and the duck and the socks chatting. Bennie was called by the bee, blowing his trumpet and the flowers, singing for him to come up from his underground library. All of these characters lived in a playroom and a park, with Oom Gert and Tannie Magda. The name "Wielie Walie" also comes from a well known South African children's song, which ended up being the theme song for the show.

Characters
Louise Smit is the creator and owner of Wielie Walie.  The puppets were built by the SABC Modelmaking Department- headed up by Rod Campbell.

 Sarel Seemonster (Sarel Seamonster) - original characters drawn by Johan Roos in Comic strips prior to 1975; puppet made by Rod Campbell
 Karel Kraai (Karel Crow) - original characters drawn by Johan Roos (copyright holder); puppet made by Rod Campbell
 Bennie Boekwurm  (Bennie Bookworm) -character copyright belongs to Louise Smit and puppet privately made by Rod Campbell
 Bytjie (Little Bee) - designed and made by Rod Campbell
 Blommetjies (Flowers) - designed and made by Rod Campbell
 Die Kouse (The Socks)
 Meend die Eend  (Meend the Duck)
 Petrus Padda (Peter the Frog)

Presenters
 Magda van Biljon
 Gert van Tonder

Original voice cast 

Bennie Boekwurm: Verna Vels Dulinda Pieters from EnterActive Productions are the Bennie Boekwurm voice
Sarel Seemonster: Francois Stemmet
Karel Kraai: Lochner De Kock
Blommetjies: Magda Van Biljon

Revival

DVD 

A remake was done in 2008, and released in 2009 on DVD, with only 2 (pilot) episodes, almost in the form of a long movie. Although there were no more presenters, a brand new character "Wagga Wagga Kwagga"-(a full body character costume),was created by the writer Louise Smit and was introduced.

Puppets:
The original rod controlled and hand puppets for Wielie Walie were made by Rod Campbell.
The new hand puppets were created by Toby Van Eck from Toby's Puppet and Prop shop, 
and the "Wagga Wagga Kwagga"-costume by Louis Niemand from LifeSize Designs. 
The show also had an entirely new voice cast.

New voice talents:

Bennie Boekwurm: Dulinda Pieters
Karel Kraai: voice artists from EnterActive Productions
Sarel Seemonster voice artists from EnterActive Productions
Meend Die Eend voice artists from EnterActive Productions
Wagga Wagga Kwagga voice artists from EnterActive Productions
Blommetjies: Dulinda Pieters
Die Kouse: Dulinda Pieters

Book 

A book : Wielie Wielie Walie appeared in 2010.  With illustrations by Sean Verster.
Sarel Seemonster, Karel Kraai and Die Kouse are all living happily in the Wielie Walie Park, near the Walie Mountains. Bennie Boekwurm, Bytjie and Blommetjies also live there, and Bennie is, as always, reading stories to his friends - he is a clever worm and has many storybooks in his Book tunnel. One fine day, a strange character appears in the Wielie Walie Park - his name is Wagga Wagga Kwag. Sarel and his friends immediately like him and they agree that he should stay and become their new friend.

Other 

Wielie Walies animated opening logo was designed and animated by Butch Stoltz, who was head of SABC TV's Animation Department.

The character of Bennie Boekwurm is copyrighted to Butch Stoltz and has also appeared in an ad-campaign for ATKV/Pendoring to promote Afrikaans. Bennie is pictured as a small worm on a hook in the ocean, with a phrase "Moenie die taal afskeep nie! / Don't disrespect the language!", this is to show what happens to the characters when the language is mistreated.

In 1980 an orchestral team of puppets with conductor Maestro Mole featured in many episodes of Wielie Walie. The puppets were made by Rod Campbell and Mike Olivier produced a magnificent set for these classical music interludes. Maestro Mole was made with an advanced internal rod control system called the MARCS or Mechanical Animation Rod Control System. Rod Campbell received a UNIMA and TV award for outstanding achievement in Puppetry.

Theme song (Traditional) 

Wielie Walie:(Afrikaans)

Wielie wielie walie
Die aap ry op die balie
Tjoef tjaf,
val hy af
Wielie wielie walie

Wielie Walie: (Translated)

Wielie wielie walie
The monkey rides on the barrel
Boom bang,
he falls off
Wielie wielie walie

See also
 Louise smit
 Haas Das se Nuuskas
 Verna Vels

External links 
 Creator Louise Smit's Website
 Puppet Builder Toby Van Eck's Website
 Wagga Wagga Kwag Costume Creators- LifeSize Designs

South African television shows featuring puppetry
South African children's television series
Afrikaans-language television shows
South African Broadcasting Corporation television shows
Television shows set in South Africa
1976 South African television series debuts
1970s South African television series
1980s South African television series
1990s South African television series